Esmond, Forbes and Gordon are three adjacent, now depleted, natural gas fields in the southern North Sea, 170 km east of Teesside.

The fields 
Esmond, Forbes and Gordon were the most northerly gas fields in the UK sector of the southern North Sea: Esmond was in Block 43/13a, Forbes in Block 43/8a and Gordon in Blocks 43/15a and 43/20a. The fields were named after Scottish clans.

The gas reservoirs are Lower Triassic Bunter sandstones at a depth of 4,470 to 5,755 feet (1,362 to 1,754 metres). The reservoir properties are:

Owner and operator 
In 1985 the licensees were Hamilton Oil GB plc (48%), Hamilton Bros Petroleum (UK) Ltd (12%), RTZ Oil and Gas Ltd (25%), Blackfriars Oil Co Ltd (12.5&), and Trans-European Co. Ltd (2.5%). The operator was Hamilton Brothers Oil & Gas Ltd. Hamilton Bros remained the operator until BHP assumed operatorship prior to decommissioning in 1995.

Development 
The three fields were individually uneconomic to develop. However, the development was viable if they were developed together. They were configured as a central processing complex (Esmond) and two unmanned satellites, Forbes and Gordon.

Production 
Processing facilities on Esmond comprised gas/condensate/water separation, Tri-ethylene glycol (TEG) dehydration, and provision for 20,000 bhp of gas compression. Condensate was injected into the gas export line.

Peak production from the three fields was:

 Esmond 1.2 billion cubic metres per year (bcmy) (1986)
 Forbes 0.5 bcmy (1986)
 Gordon 0.4 bcmy (1986)

By 1995 Esmond had produced around 8.5 x 109 standard cubic metres. That was about 93% of the recoverable reserves in the reservoir.

Later developments 
Decommissioning was approved in 1993-5; the Forbes platform was recovered to shore in 1993, the Esmond and Gordon installations were taken to a yard in the Netherlands for dismantling in 1995. 

The 24-inch Esmond to Bacton pipeline was known as the Esmond Transmission System (ETS). Following decommissioning of Esmond in 1995 the pipeline was reconfigured and reused to transport gas from Tyne and Trent fed by a 20-inch pipeline. The 37 km northerly part of the ETS was disconnected. The remainder was renamed EAGLES East Anglia Gas And Liquids Evacuation System Pipeline. Tyne production ceased in 2015. The Cygnus gas field has used the pipeline since 2016.

There are proposals to use the Esmond reservoir for carbon dioxide storage.

References 

Natural gas fields in the United Kingdom
North Sea energy